Drăgănești is a commune in Neamț County, Western Moldavia, Romania. It is composed of four villages: Drăgănești, Orțăști, Râșca and Șoimărești. These were part of Brusturi-Drăgănești Commune until 2004, when they were split off and the remainder was renamed Brusturi.

References

Communes in Neamț County
Localities in Western Moldavia